"Am I my brother's keeper?" is a saying from the Bible. It comes from the story of Cain and Abel. After Cain murdered his brother Abel, God asked him where his brother was, and Cain answered: "I know not; am I my brother's keeper?" This quote entered the English language through William Tyndale and his translation of the Bible into English.

The phrase and story is used in Judaism and Christianity. It shows not only Cain's wrongness in not looking after his brother's well-being, but his hiding of the crime of fratricide.

See also 
 Good Samaritan
 Love thy neighbour as thyself

Notes

References 

Cain and Abel
Articles about multiple people in the Bible
Bereshit (parashah)
Biblical murder victims
Biblical murderers
Book of Genesis people
Brother duos
Children of Adam and Eve
Hebrew Bible words and phrases